Nikolai Rein (born 25 November 1989) is a German male acrobatic gymnast. Along with his partner, Sophie Bruehmann, he competed in the 2014 Acrobatic Gymnastics World Championships.

References

1989 births
Living people
German acrobatic gymnasts
Male acrobatic gymnasts
European Games competitors for Germany
Gymnasts at the 2015 European Games